King Taco is a fast food restaurant chain headquartered in Los Angeles, California, which offers a variety of Mexican-inspired dishes, including soft tacos, burritos, sopes, tamales, nachos, and rotisserie chicken. The chain was founded in 1974 by Raul Martinez, and since then, it has expanded to over 20 locations throughout Southern California.

History

King Taco was founded in 1974 by Raul Martínez, Sr., who operated a mobile lunch wagon out of a converted ice cream truck. Within six months, he opened the first of the chain's restaurants in Cypress Park. Other locations soon followed, opening every other year in Commerce, Baldwin Park, El Monte and other East Los Angeles sites. By 1995, he had established fourteen restaurants grossing over $21 million.

As of August 6, 2015, a grand opening was held at the new location in the heart of the city of Glendale, California, bringing the total to 23 restaurants that are now located throughout Los Angeles County and San Bernardino County. They also recently opened new restaurants in Old Town Pasadena and Long Beach, which are among the few King Taco restaurants not located in a predominantly Mexican American neighborhood. The company has contributed to urban revitalization through the retrofitting of vacant commercial buildings for its restaurants. Additionally, King Taco has expanded into the Inland Empire, with restaurants in Ontario, California, and Fontana, California.

Company founder Raul Martinez Sr. died on December 3, 2013, at the age of 71 while visiting family in Mexico City.

Sponsorships
In 2003, King Taco was the sponsor of the Champ Car season finale at the California Speedway. Called the King Taco 500, the race was eventually canceled as a result of the forest fires that devastated the Southern California area at the time.

For the 2019 Acura Grand Prix of Long Beach, King Taco was the primary sponsor on the Harding Steinbrenner #88 Honda/Dallara IR-18 IndyCar driven by rookie Colton Herta.

Legal matters
King Taco Restaurant, Inc. filed a trademark infringement lawsuit against King Taco Express, Inc., Emmanuel Luna, and Sol Celene Rojas in the United States District Court for the District of Nevada in March 2008. King Taco Restaurant, Inc. won the lawsuit.

See also
 List of Mexican restaurants

References

External links
 

American companies established in 1974
Companies based in Los Angeles
Mexican restaurants
Restaurants established in 1974
Restaurants in Los Angeles